Damir Džumhur was the defending champion but lost in the semifinals to Jan-Lennard Struff.

Struff won the title after defeating Robin Haase 6–4, 6–1 in the final.

Seeds

Draw

Finals

Top half

Bottom half

References
Main Draw
Qualifying Draw

TEAN International - Men's Singles
2016 TEAN International - Men's Singles
TEAN International - Men's Singles